Palabi Kothay is a Bangladeshi feminist comedy film released in 1997. It is a finest example of Bangladeshi women-oriented film. Humayun Faridi produced the film. Palabi Kothay is one of flop films in Bangladesh. The film is a remake of Kamal Haasan's own Tamil hit, Magalir Mattum which itself was a remake of the 1980 American film 9 to 5.

Plot
The film tells the story of three female characters struggling in the office Shirin and Nuri were teased by the office boss. Millie teaches them to stand up against all these injustices. After many storms, problems and incidents, they are able to protest against the injustice.

Cast
 Shabana as Mili Chowdhury
 Suborna Mustafa as Shirin
 Champa as Noorie
 Humayun Faridi as Mr. Hawlader
 Afzal Hossain as Managing Director (guest appearance)
 Ali Raj as Bachchu
 Khaleda Aktar Kolpona as Shirin's mother
 Khairul Islam Pakhi as Shirin's brother
 Sharmin as Salma, wife of Mr. Hawlader
 Nasir Khan as Lallu Khan
 Abdul Karim as Old man in slum
 Sharbari Dasgupta
 Jacky Alamgir
 Sitara Begum
 Mozid Bongobasi
 Rasheda Chowdhury
 Alka Sarkar

Production
Humayun Faridi was the main producer of the film. Shahidul Islam Khokon was filmmaker and director. He sold his house situated in Uttara to collect fund of this film

Reception
Palabi Kothay shows a strong advocate for women's rights in a simple way. The film was well received by the audience after its release. It was highly acclaimed for its speeches and performances.

Music

Awards

References

External links

1997 films
1990s Bengali-language films
Bengali-language Bangladeshi films
Bengali remakes of Tamil films
Films about sexual harassment
Films about women in Bangladesh
Bangladeshi comedy-drama films
Bangladeshi feminist films
Bangladeshi remakes of Tamil films